Capri-Sun is a brand of juice concentrate drinks based in Germany and Switzerland. Invented by Rudolf Wild, it was introduced in West Germany in 1969 by his company as Capri-Sonne (a name retired in favor of the English name in 2017). It is now sold in over 100 countries, with licensees including Kraft Foods in the United States (as Capri Sun) oand Coca-Cola Europacific Partners in parts of Europe. , roughly 7 billion pouches are sold per year, making it one of few globally prominent soft drinks not originating from the United States.

Since its launch, Capri-Sun has been packaged in laminated foil vacuum Doy-N-Pack pouches, with which the brand has become strongly associated. In the United States, these pouches were innovative as the first single-serving fruit juice containers. The pouch design has stayed largely the same, but changes in some markets have included transparent bottoms and paper straws, while other container types have been introduced for some products. Capri-Sun is available in varying ranges of flavors in different countries, targeting different national flavor profiles. Globally, its best-known flavor is Orange.

Capri-Sun's main products are high in sugar content, although lower than many competitors. Characterizations of the juice drinks as "all-natural" have led to conflict in several countries between consumer advocates who highlight the high sugar content and low juice percentage, and Capri-Sun and its licensees, who in most cases have maintained that the term correctly describes the ingredients. In the United States, Capri Sun Inc. was owned by tobacco conglomerate Philip Morris Cos. ( Altria) from 1991 to 2007. Prohibited from selling tobacco to children, Philip Morris executives applied their experience to sugary drinks including Capri Sun, adding the pouches to Lunchables and advertising them through a "California cool" aesthetic. Kraft continued to use Philip Morris's techniques after it became independent in 2007.

Capri Sun is one of the most favorably rated brands in the United States among Generation Z. About a third of American parents view the drink as healthy. In France, Capri-Sun has figured prominently in rap songs and has been noted as a drink of choice in poor areas. Disputes over sugar content, "all-natural" status, and marketing to children have led to two lawsuits in the United States (one of which led to the abandonment of "all-natural" for a time), the removal of Capri-Sun from Tesco shelves in the United Kingdom, and a negative award from Foodwatch for deceptive marketing to children.

History

Origins and global overview 

Rudolf Wild of Heidelberg founded Rudolf Wild & Co. (better known as Wild) in the German Reich in 1931, during the Weimar Republic. After World War II, Rudolf Wild created Libella, which the Lexington Herald-Leader in 1998 described as "the first all-natural soda made with real fruit juice". This led him to several new products, including Capri-Sonne, which was developed in the 1960s. Restrictions on color additives at the time in West Germany led to less visually appealing soft drinks, incentivizing opaque packaging. Rudolf Wild & Co. engaged with Thimonnier, a French company that primarily manufactured sewing machines, for rights to use their patented pouch design and patented pouch-making machines. According to Rudolf's son Hans-Peter Wild, Rudolf Wild & Co. did not obtain exclusive rights from Thimonnier, but rather by ordering all of the machines they made. After initial issues with spoilage and stains were resolved, the product debuted in West Germany in 1969. The name references the Italian island of Capri due to its status as a vacation destination.

At the initiative of Hans-Peter Wild, champion boxer Muhammad Ali began promoting the brand in 1978; it was his first endorsement deal. SiSi-Werke, the Wild subsidiary responsible for Capri-Sonne, said that the deal included one crate of the product a week for four years. The endorsement—in which Ali said Capri-Sonne was, like him, "the greatest of all time"—led to a significant increase in sales. By 1982, Capri-Sun was sold in 23 countries and the most popular fruit juice in 19 of 23. Availability rose to 52 countries by 1991.

SiSi-Werke changed its name to Capri Sun GmbH in December 2018. Capri Sun GmbH is organized and headquartered in Germany and is a subsidiary of Swiss companies Capri Sun AG and Capri Sun Group Holding AG and German company Wild; this makes it unusual in a largely American-led beverage industry. Wild licenses the brand to different companies, which  bottle Capri-Sun in 18 countries; Wild subsidiary INDAG supplies the various bottling plants.

, Capri-Sun sells an estimated 7 billion pouches per year globally. , Americans and Germans drink around 6 Capri-Sun pouches per year, while Réunion has the highest consumption at 9.6. , Forbes reports sales in more than 100 countries, netting roughly $500 million per year.

North America

1979–1991: Shasta Beverages 
In 1979, Shasta Beverages (then a part of Consolidated Foods) began to license the drink from Wild in the United States under the name Capri Sun. After promising test runs in Buffalo, New York, and Atlanta, Georgia, Shasta began a rolling expansion, starting with the Midwestern and Southeastern United States in 1980 and 1981. 

When Shasta introduced the product in the United States, its single-serving packaging was unusual in contrast with the 46-fluid-ounce (1.4L) aluminum cans that dominated the fruit juice market. Despite initial issues on rollout, the packaging carried the advantage of being light, durable, blunt, long-lasting, freezable, and insular. The patented design, trademarked under the name Doy-N-Pack and exclusively licensed by Shasta from Wild, soon faced a competitor in aseptic "brick packaging" like Tetra Pak. Both proved popular in stores, and Doy-N-Pack would usher in the use of pouches for single-serving food and beverage containers in the United States.

Shasta intended the product for children around ages 7 to 12, with its marketing director for new products telling a journalist, "Adults have a mental block about putting the straw in—they try to be careful and it just doesn't work." Instead of general advertising, Shasta's marketing placed image spots in kids' magazines such as DuckTales and Sports Illustrated for Kids, building brand loyalty based on promotional offers, word of mouth, and child-oriented package design. Early marketing emphasized the product as all-natural, a designation that was met with some criticism. By 1982, it had a 10% market share in the markets where it was available, with aims of a 15–20% share against competitors Hi-C and Hawaiian Punch, which were about half its price. Most of Capri Sun's early market share gains came at the expense of small brands.

In 1983, the Capri Sun brand brought Shasta $28 million in sales. In 1985, Sara Lee (the former Consolidated Foods) sold Shasta to National Beverage. A dedicated company was established to market Capri Sun in the 1980s, headquartered in San Mateo, California, with factories in nearby Fresno and in Granite City, Illinois. In 1990, Capri Sun sold 450 million pouches.

1991–present: Kraft Foods 
On 19 December 1991, Kraft General Foods announced a buyout of Capri Sun Inc., making it part of General Foods USA. Kraft's acquisition of Capri Sun was expected to strengthen the former's share in the juices and drinks market, and to provide increased marketing power for Capri Sun. Kraft's parent company, Philip Morris Cos. ( Altria), had experience selling cigarettes to young people but was barred from marketing to children, and so adapted those strategies to sugary drinks including Capri Sun, Kool-Aid, and Tang. Through Kraft's acquisition of Capri Sun, however, Philip Morris could target a product to children between the ages of 6 and 14, in ways that represented a significant shift in the product's marketing strategy. Philip Morris's campaign for Capri Sun emphasized flashy colors and beach scenes, evoking a bright and fun "California cool"; later, they would switch to a sporty theme. In 1994, Philip Morris added Capri Sun to Lunchables, prepackaged lunch sets for schoolchildren. Lunchables sales increased by over a third in 1994; by 1998, sales exceeded over half a billion dollars. By 2006, marketing techniques had gone online as well, including a website where children under the age of 13 could submit photos for a chance to win a vacation for their families or send Capri Sun–themed greeting cards.

At the same time these marketing changes were occurring, obesity rates among children in the United States began rising, a phenomenon attributed in part to the rise in sugary drinks consumption across the board–including food industry advertising, which has been linked to a rise in obesity in both children and adults. A 2019 review in The BMJ found that the marketing techniques introduced by Philip Morris were still in use, even after Kraft became independent of the company in 2007.

Kraft's acquisition of Capri Sun Inc. included marketing rights of Capri Sun in Canada, Mexico, and the U.S. territory of Puerto Rico. Kraft announced in 2000 that it would be launching Capri Sun in Mexico, imported from the U.S.; in 2013, Jumex, rather than Kraft, announced plans to bring Capri-Sun to the Mexican market for the first time, with Capri Sun AG and sister company WILD-INDAG providing equipment and support. Capri Sun was being advertised in Canada by March 1991, continuing after Kraft's purchase in September; a 2009 CNN Money article noted Kraft as the distributor there. , Kraft licenses the Capri Sun brand in the United States, Canada, and Puerto Rico.

In January 2007, a Florida woman, backed by the Center for Science in the Public Interest, sued Kraft for deceptive packaging, alleging that its usage of high-fructose corn syrup (HFCS) made its claimed "all-natural" status inaccurate. Kraft announced a day later that they would cease labeling Capri Sun that way as part of a planned reformulation and repackaging, replacing the words with "no artificial colors, flavors, or preservatives". In 2015, facing declining sales, Kraft switched the main Capri Sun line from HFCS to sugar and switched the Roarin' Waters flavored water brand from HFCS and sucralose to sugar and Stevia. In January 2023, a class action was filed disputing the new tagline in light of Capri Sun apple juice's use of citric acid.

In 2017, Capri Sun GmbH sued American Beverage, claiming that the company's use of pouches to market SunnyD constituted trademark infringement. The U.S. District Judge, Paul A. Engelmayer, found conflicting evidence as to whether the pouch design was regularly associated with Capri Sun by consumers, with Capri Sun GmbH asserting the notion and American Beverage disputing it. Capri Sun GmbH has sued other companies for infringement on the design in the past, securing a $650,000 licensing fee from Faribault Foods in one such lawsuit. , the case was scheduled for a jury trial.

In the 2020s, Capri Sun has been noted for its marketing to parents, still in the hope that they would give the drink to their children. In 2020, Kraft used the Granite City plant to manufacture pouches of filtered water labelled "we're sorry it's not juice", donating 5 million to schools in the Granite City area and Chicagoland. The accompanying ad campaign, according to Ad Age, was targeted towards parents in the area who were concerned about COVID-19 pandemic safety restrictions shutting down water fountains. In 2022, the company released an advertisement more directly targeted at parents, starring a character modeled after the male leads of romance novels designed to disinterest children, before changing tack to pitch Capri Sun.

Europe, Africa, and Asia 
Capri-Sun established a factory in Nigeria in 1980. , Capri-Sun is the most popular fruit juice drink among children in Nigeria, where it is licensed by Chi Limited, a Coca-Cola Company subsidiary.

After initial poor sales under RHM Foods, Coca-Cola Schweppes Beverages took over production of Capri-Sun in the United Kingdom in 1994. Coca-Cola Enterprises, which bought Coca-Cola Schweppes in 1997, began marketing the drink in France in 2007. , Capri-Sun is marketed in France, Ireland, the Netherlands, and the United Kingdom by Coca-Cola Europacific Partners (CCEP), successor to Coca-Cola Enterprises. In 2015, British retailer Tesco announced that it would stop selling Capri-Sun, as part of an initiative to replace drinks that contain added sugars; The Guardian characterized the move as an unprecedented action against a branded sugary drink supplier like CCEP. In France, 213 million pouches were sold in 2016, a 24% increase from the previous year. Sales increased another 20% the next year, to 250 million.

Capri-Sun products first became available in China in 2005, but did not spread beyond the Beijing area until 2015, when Reignwood Group partnered with Capri-Sun to expand nationwide. Their factory in the Beijing Yanqi Economic Development Area has a capacity of 650 million pouches per year. According to China Daily, Capri-Sun sold 80 million pouches in China in 2015. Agthia Group began producing Capri-Sun in the United Arab Emirates in 2009, selling also to other countries including Kuwait. They discontinued the brand 2020.

SiSi-Werke attempted to secure trademarks for eight of its pouch designs in the European Union; the European Court of Justice, which has consistently rejected trademarks based on product shape, turned the request down in 2006. On 21 February 2017, SiSi-Werke announced that it would be renaming Capri-Sonne to Capri-Sun in Germany, the last country to retain the original name. The brand faced some criticism for the change, some of it lighthearted in tone; it did not rule out reintroducing the name at a later date.

Products 

A Capri-Sun executive told China Daily in 2016 that they produce 27 flavors worldwide. The best-known flavor globally is Orange. In the United States, an initial roster of Orange, Apple, Lemonade, and Fruit Punch has expanded to include Mountain Cooler (apple and raspberry), Strawberry Kiwi, Wild Cherry, Pacific Cooler (apple, cherry, pineapple, and raspberry), Tropical Punch (strawberry, orange, pineapple, lemon, and lime), and Grape Geyser. Options vary by country: In France , for instance, there are only Classic (orange), Crush, and two organic ("") flavors—red multifruit (apple, blackcurrant, and cherry) and yellow multifruit (apple, banana, and passionfruit); Orange, Tropical, Blackcurrant, and Cherry are sold in the United Kingdom ; and  the Chinese market has Orange, White Grape, Pear, and Peach Apple. Flavor profile varies as well: German fruit flavors are riper than French ones. Flavors in China, Mexico, and the United Arab Emirates are sweeter than those used in Europe, which Capri-Sun says is to cater to local tastes; likewise, Hungarian cherry flavors are more sour than elsewhere. 

In addition to the main line of fruit-juice-based beverages, American Capri Sun products have included a 100% juice variant and Roarin' Waters, a line of flavored waters. The United Kingdom has its own flavored water line, Fruity Water, as well as squash (concentrated syrup).

Capri-Sun drinks are canned in laminate vacuum pouches. In 2021, a TikTok video went viral after a father discovered mold in his daughter's Capri Sun through the package's clear bottom; Capri Sun stated that finding contaminants are the purpose of the clear bottom, that the mold is naturally occurring, and that testing of the packaging showed that it was not sealed properly. A year later, a recall was announced on over 5,000 Capri Sun Wild Cherry pouches after it was discovered that some were contaminated with cleaning supplies. Capri Sun also faced criticism in the United Kingdom for introducing paper straws to its pouches, a move it said was environmentally friendly; consumers complained about the straw's inability to pierce the pouch in opening the drink, as well as the still-existing plastic wrapping on the straw, which Capri-Sun said was required under British law.

In addition to the well-known Doy-N-Pak pouch, Capri-Sun comes in other packaging in various markets, including a resealable pouch with safety cap used on some products. The squash lines are sold in one-liter plastic bottles.

A 2009 comparison of various flavored drinks published by the Harvard T.H. Chan School of Public Health classified Capri Sun Juice Drink Strawberry Kiwi, along with all of the other surveyed fruit punch and fruit juice drinks, in the red (least healthy) tier. Drinks in the red tier, which had a classification requirement of more than 12 grams (2.9 teaspoons) of sugar per 12 ounces (.35L), were advised to be consumed only "sparingly and infrequently". At 34 grams (8.1 tsp) of sugar, the drink's sugar content was the lowest in the category. Capri Sun Sport Sports Drink Lemon Lime, an energy drink with 20 grams (4.8 tsp) of sugar per 12 ounces, was also placed in the red tier. In 2022, Capri Sun lowered its sugar content from 14 grams to 8 by adding monk fruit concentrate to the ingredient list.

Reception and impact 
A 2022 review of fruit punch drinks in the Marin Independent Journal gave Capri Sun All Natural Fruit Punch two stars, noting its lower sugar content compared to other listed sugary drinks but criticizing its taste as "watery" and non-evocative of the fruits depicted on the label. A 2017 review of "your kids' lunch box favorites" by Brooke Jackson-Glidden in the Statesman Journal noted the Capri Sun Strawberry Kiwi's 13 grams of sugar, praising its moderately sweet taste and small size. The paper's "resident intern", Young Cooper, commented that it was "definitely not the best flavor of Capri Sun." Marnie Shure of The Takeout, reviewing Capri Sun fruit punch after the switch to monk fruit, wrote that the sweetness had now become the primary flavor, rather than notes of actual fruit as before, and assessed a perhaps 5% increase in tartness, but complimented the lack of aftertaste she associated with most sweeteners. Chad Eschman of Vinepair reviewed Capri Sun flavors as they relate to creating mixers; reviews included positively rating the combination of gin and Pacific Cooler as tasting like a large white gummy bear and negatively rating the combination of tequila and Tropical Cooler as "we've made a huge mistake".

Roarin' Waters faced early criticism for its sugariness and lack of juice. Gannett News Service's Kim Painter characterized it as "a reduced-calorie fruit drink, apparently made for children who expect all drinks, even water, to be sweet", while James Lileks of the Minneapolist Star Tribune wrote that his daughter thought it tasted like Easy Mac.

In media 

A number of French rap artists, including Jul and Timal, have referenced Capri Sun in their songs. Rappers BoyBandit and Edinho have both written songs called "CAPRI-SUN". Nicolas Santolaria of Le Monde in November 2020 described Capri-Sun as "the new ostentatious elixir of French rappers and gangsters". Humorist Alexandre Majirus connected the trend to a broader phenomenon of 1990s nostalgia in rap. A Coca-Cola France representative told Slate.fr that they were not working with the rappers and neither supported nor opposed the trend. Capri-Sun had a line associating the brand with drug use removed from Naps's "".

Public perception 
A 2015 study in Public Health Nutrition on American parents' attitudes towards sugary drinks found that 36% of surveyed parents with children between the ages of 2 and 17 rated Capri Sun as "somewhat" or "very healthy", with 48% saying that they gave the drink to their children in that age. Black and Hispanic parents were significantly more likely to rate Capri Sun as healthy than white parents, and the rating was higher than sugary fruit drinks as a category, which only 30% of parents gave the same rating. Regarding Roarin' Waters, 39% rated the same, but only 16% said that they give their children the drink. Hispanic parents were significantly more likely than white parents to rate the product as healthy, although black parents were not. Roarin' Waters was one of a few products to be rated as less healthy than its category overall; 48% rated flavored water drinks as healthy. The study concluded that those parents may have selected Capri Sun Roarin' Waters because they consider it a healthier option.

A 2013 online poll from Foodwatch, a European consumer protection group, resulted in Capri-Sun receiving a "Golden Windbag" award for perceived deceptive advertising to children. Capri-Sun denied that its advertising was targeted towards children.

In 2015, author Josephine Lébard noted Capri-Sun's popularity, along with that of SunnyD, in Clichy-sous-Bois, a banlieue near Paris—indicative of the drink's broad popularity in poorer areas in France. A representative of Coca-Cola France told Slate.fr in 2018 that 87% of families with children under 15 recognized the Capri-Sun brand. A report from the Rudd Center for Food Policy and Health found that the average black child in the United States between the ages of 6 and 11 viewed an ad for Capri-Sun 21 times in 2018; for a white child in the same age group, that number was 11.

A 2022 Morning Consult survey of American Generation Z adults ranked Capri Sun in 17th place out of over 4,000 on a list of their most favored brands, with 77% rating the brand favorably. Capri Sun was also one of the brands with the largest differential between Gen Z and older peers; the brand's favorability rating with Gen Z was 16 percentage points higher than the U.S. adult population at large, 19th highest in the brands surveyed, and 7 percentage points higher than the Millennial respondents, for 16th place.

Notes

References

Citations

Sources

Academic sources

News coverage

Trade publications

Reviews and opinion pieces

Other independent sources

Sources connected to Capri-Sun

External links

 

Kraft Foods brands
Juice brands
Products introduced in 1969
Coca-Cola brands